Melaniia Tur (born 8 March 2005) is a Ukrainian rhythmic gymnast. She is the 2020 Junior European champion in the team category.

Career

Junior 
Tur debuted at the 2019 Junior World Championships in Moscow as part of the Ukrainian group, being 16th in the All-Around, with 5 hoops and teams as well as 12th with 5 ribbons. In 2020 she represented Ukraine in Kyiv for the European Championships along Polina Karika, Karina Sydorak and the senior group, together they won gold in teams and she also finished 6th with clubs.

She became a senior in 2021 participating at the World Cup in Minsk where she finished 12th in the All-Around, 13th with hoop and ball, 15th with clubs and 12th with ribbon. In 2022 she competed at the World Cup in Pesaro ending 20th in the All-Around, 18th with hoop, 21st ball, 19th with clubs and 24th with ribbon. She was then selected for the European Championships in Tel Aviv where she was 8th in teams, 27th in the All-Around, 28th with hoop, 36th with ball and 36th with clubs.

References 

2005 births
Living people
Ukrainian rhythmic gymnasts
Medalists at the Rhythmic Gymnastics European Championships
People from Dnipropetrovsk Oblast
Sportspeople from Dnipropetrovsk Oblast